The Gerichtsbezirk Oberburg (Court District of Oberberg) (Slovenian: sodni okraj Gornji Grad) was in the Bezirksgericht Oberburg with was under the Gerichtsbezirk of the state of Steiermark. It was composed of part of the Bezirks Cilli (Celje) and was lost to Yugoslavia in 1919.

History
The Gerichtsbezirk Oberburg was created by an 1849 decision by the Landes-Gerichts-Einführungs-Kommission (State Court Launch Commission) and originally composed of eight communities: Kokarje (Altenburg), Laufen, Leutsch, Neustift, Oberburg, Praßberg, Rietz and Sulzbach. The Gerichtsbezirk Oberburg was formed in to provide a political decentralization of the judicial administration and since 1868 this district together with the Gerichtsbezirken Cilli, Gonobitz, Franz, Sankt Marein bei Erlachstein and Tüffer of Bezirk Cilli.

The Gerichsbezick had a population of 15,394 in 1890, with 15,371 Slovenians and 18 Germans who spoke a local dialect. There was another census in 1910, which showed that the Gerichtsbezirk had a total population of 15,296, of which 15,217 (99.5%) spoke Slovenian and 56 (0.4%) spoke German.

Due to the border regulations of September 10, 1919 enforced by the Treaty of Saint-Germain, the entirety of the Gerichtsbezirk Oberberg was ceded to the Kingdom of Yugoslavia.

Circuit Court
In 1910, the Gerichtssprengel (circuit court) Oberberg included the ten following communities shortly before its dissolution: Bočna (Wotschna), Gornji Grad (Oberburg), Kokarje (Altenburg), Ljubo (Laufen), Luče (Leutsch), Mozirje Trg (Praßberg), Nova Štifta (Neustift), Rečica (Rietz) und Solčava (Sulzbach).

Gerichtssprengel 
Der Gerichtssprengel Oberburg umfasste im Jahr 1910 kurz vor seiner Auflösung die zehn Gemeinden Bočna (Wotschna), Oberburg (Oberburg), Kokarje (Altenburg), Ljubo (Laufen), Luče (Leutsch), Mozirje Trg (Praßberg), Nova Štifta (Neustift), Rečica (Rietz) und Solčava (Sulzbach).

Literature 
 k. k. Statististische Central-Commission (Hrsg.): Special-Orts-Repertorium der im Österreichischen Reichsrathe vertretenen Königreiche und Länder. Neubearbeitung auf Grund der Ergebnisse der Volkszählung vom 31. December 1899. IV. Steiermark. Wien 1893
 k. k. Statististische Zentralkommission (Hrsg.): Spezialortsrepertorium von Steiermark. Bearbeitet auf Grund der Ergebnisse der Volkszählung vom 31. Dezember 1910. Wien 1917

References 

Districts of Austria